Yannis C. Yortsos is the Dean of the Viterbi School of Engineering at the University of Southern California.

References

University of Southern California people
California Institute of Technology alumni
Greek emigrants to the United States
Living people
Year of birth missing (living people)
Members of the United States National Academy of Engineering